Round One: The Album is the first studio album released by the former four division boxing champion, Roy Jones Jr. The album features the single "That Was Then" which peaked at number 2 on the Hot Rap Singles chart and number 57 on the Hot R&B/Hip-Hop Singles & Tracks chart in the U.S. Roy Jones Jr. would go on to release a second album with the group Body Head Bangerz, titled Body Head Bangerz: Volume One.

Track listing

Chart positions

2002 debut albums
Roy Jones Jr. albums

ru:Round One: The Album